Adam Feeney and Robert Smeets were the defending champions. Feeney chose to not participate and Smeets played with Brydan Klein. They were eliminated by Prakash Amritraj and Dustin Brown in the first round.
Joshua Goodall and Jonathan Marray won the final 6–7(1), 6–3, [11–9], against Colin Fleming and Ken Skupski.

Seeds

Draw

Draw

References
 Doubles Draw
 Qualifying Draw

Manchester Trophy - Doubles
Aegon Manchester Trophy